Lucas Gastón Robertone (born 18 March 1997) is an Argentine footballer who plays as a central midfielder for Spanish club UD Almería.

Club career

Vélez Sarsfield
Born in Concordia, Entre Ríos, Robertone joined Vélez Sarsfield's youth setup in 2011, aged 14. He made his first team debut on 16 August 2016, starting in a 1–1 away draw (3–4 penalty loss) against Juventud Unida de Gualeguaychú, for the season's Copa Argentina.

Robertone made his Primera División debut on 27 August 2016, coming on as a late substitute for Gonzalo Díaz in a 0–2 away loss against Gimnasia y Esgrima La Plata. After being rarely used in his first season, he started to feature more regularly, and scored his first senior goal on 24 February 2018, netting the game's only in a 1–0 home win against River Plate.

On 21 April 2018, Robertone scored a brace in a 4–2 away defeat of Temperley. On 13 November, he renewed his contract until 2021.

Almería
On 1 October 2020, Robertone signed a five-year contract with Spanish Segunda División side UD Almería, who paid a rumoured fee of €3.4 million for 50% of his federative rights; the club is also obliged to buy another 30% if certain variables are reached.

References

External links

1997 births
Living people
People from Concordia, Entre Ríos
Sportspeople from Entre Ríos Province
Argentine footballers
Association football midfielders
Argentine Primera División players
Club Atlético Vélez Sarsfield footballers
Segunda División players
UD Almería players
Argentine expatriate footballers
Argentine expatriate sportspeople in Spain
Expatriate footballers in Spain